Paracladycnis is a monotypic genus of Malagasy nursery web spiders containing the single species, Paracladycnis vis. It was first described by P. Blandin in 1979, and is only found on Madagascar.

See also
 List of Pisauridae species

References

Monotypic Araneomorphae genera
Pisauridae
Spiders of Madagascar